Wilfred Innerd (1878 – 24 June 1967) was a professional footballer who played for Wallsend Park Villa, Newcastle United, Crystal Palace, Shildon Athletic and Newcastle City.

He signed for Newcastle United from Wallsend Park Villa in May 1900. Innerd found it hard to break into the Newcastle side, which was the pre-eminent team of the era, and played mainly for the reserve team, Newcastle United 'A's. He made only three appearances in the first team, two in 1901 and a final appearance in 1905. At the end of the 1905 season Innerd signed for Crystal Palace and took over as captain from Ted Birnie in 1906. He captained the club during their shock FA Cup win over Newcastle in 1907. Innerd was a regular in the side until he was badly injured in a January 1909 FA Cup match against Wolverhampton Wanderers which curtailed his Palace career.

References 

1878 births
1967 deaths
Footballers from Newcastle upon Tyne
English footballers
Wallsend F.C. players
Newcastle United F.C. players
Crystal Palace F.C. players
Shildon A.F.C. players
Newcastle City F.C. players
English Football League players
Southern Football League players
Association football midfielders